Shinji Yamada (born 24 February 1994) is a Japanese professional footballer who plays as a left midfielder for Berliner AK 07.

Career
Yamada joined Regionalliga Nordost club Viktoria Berlin from Regionalliga Nord side BSV Schwarz-Weiß Rehden in August 2019, following manager . In April 2020 he agreed a contract extension until 2021 with the club.

In summer 2022, following Viktoria Berlin's relegation from the 3. Liga, Yamada joined city rivals Berliner AK of the Regionalliga Nordost.

References

External links
 
 

Living people
1994 births
Japanese footballers
Association football midfielders
3. Liga players
Regionalliga players
Berliner AK 07 players
BSV Schwarz-Weiß Rehden players
FC Viktoria 1889 Berlin players
Japanese expatriate footballers
Expatriate footballers in Germany
Japanese expatriates in Germany